Max Kiel Rasmussen (born 11 December 1945) is a Danish former footballer who played as a midfielder. He competed with the Denmark national team in the men's tournament at the 1972 Summer Olympics.

References

External links
 
 
 

1945 births
Living people
People from Lemvig
Danish men's footballers
Association football midfielders
Denmark international footballers
Olympic footballers of Denmark
Footballers at the 1972 Summer Olympics
FC Midtjylland players
Akademisk Boldklub players
Vejle Boldklub players
Sportspeople from the Central Denmark Region